Lad: A Yorkshire Story is a 2011 British film detailing the coming-of age of 13 year-old Tom, who goes off the rails after his father dies. Tom is given community service after committing an offence, the sentence being to work with a Yorkshire Dales park ranger repairing paths and building stiles. The film was released in 2013 after being adapted from a short film from 2011 by the same director.

The film was only given a limited release as its director, Dan Hartley, couldn't find a distributor. However, during the 2020 lockdowns caused by the Covid-19 pandemic, online downloads of the film soared to over 400,000 and the film garnered praise from viewers.

Synopsis
Tom Proctor is a 13-year old teenager living in the Yorkshire Dales. One day, his father, who is a quarryman, unexpectedly dies, and when the bank threatens to foreclose on his deceased father's house mortgage, the family fear they will lose the quarry cottage. In protest Tom borrows a tractor and sprays the local bank with manure, which gets him into trouble and he is made to do community service with Al, a Yorkshire Dales park ranger. At the same time, Tom and his mum worry about each other and Tom's older brother Nick, whom he idolises, joins the army.

Cast
Bretten Lord as Tom Proctor
Alan Gibson as Al Thorpe
Nancy Clarkson as Sarah Proctor
Robert Hayes as Nick Proctor
Liam Thomas as David Proctor
Molly McGlynn as Lucy Thorpe

Production
The film was shot in and around the Yorkshire Dales, (within a  radius of Settle) where Dan Hartley, the writer and director, grew up. It is partly autobiographical, with the character of Tom being based on Dan Hartley, and that of Al being based on a park ranger who Dan worked with in his teens.

One of the reasons why distributors were reluctant to sign up to distribute the film was the lack of a 'name' in the cast. In fact, prior to the filming of Lad, the two main actors had not acted professionally before. Alan Gibson, who played Al, the park ranger, claimed to have been a soldier in the SAS.

Reception
Steve Morrissey, writing in the Radio Times gave the film three stars out of five saying that "[Bretten Lord] delivers a charismatic debut performance".

Lad..., won awards for Best Film and Best Feature Narrative Film, at the Mexico International and Anchorage International Film Festival's respectively.

The film became a surprise download/streaming success during the 2020 lockdowns. Over 1.5 million people had watched it on YouTube in 2020 and it had amassed over 400,000 in viewing figures on Amazon Prime. Whilst the film was shot on a budget of £65,000, Hartley acknowledges that he won't make any money off of the project.

References

External links
 
 
Eye for film review

2013 films
British drama films
Films set in Yorkshire
Films shot in Yorkshire
2013 drama films
2010s English-language films
2010s British films